Incoltorrida is a genus of myxophagan water beetles from Madagascar in the family Torridincolidae.

Species
 I. benesculpta Perkins & Bergsten, 2019
 I. galoko Perkins & Bergsten, 2019
 I. madagassica Steffan, 1973
 I. magna Perkins & Bergsten, 2019
 I. merojejy Perkins & Bergsten, 2019
 I. quintacostata Perkins & Bergsten, 2019
 I. zahamena Perkins & Bergsten, 2019

References

Myxophaga genera